Eurostar Group is a holding company founded by SNCF Voyageurs, Caisse de dépôt et placement du Québec, SNCB, and Federated Hermes Infrastructure in 2022. It aims at merging the operations of Thalys and Eurostar high-speed rail services between France, United Kingdom, Belgium, Netherlands, and Germany.

History 
In September 2019, Eurostar and Thalys shareholders introduced a plan to merge the two companies, a project named Green Speed. Both companies already operate in France, Belgium, and the Netherlands, with Eurostar also operating in the United Kingdom, and Thalys also operating in Germany, and SNCF already owns a majority stake in both of them. The project aims at reducing costs, and at providing a more seamless experience to passengers, with the use of a single ticketing system and loyalty program.

After being delayed by COVID-19 pandemic, the project resumes in October 2021. It is announced that both services would be operated under the Eurostar brand, the Thalys brand being dropped, with current Eurostar service being renamed Eurostar Blue, and existing Thalys service Eurostar Red.

European Commission approved the merger project on 29 March 2022.

In April 2022, the new holding company, Eurostar Group, was established in Belgium. It is owned by the previous shareholders of Eurostar and Thalys, with SNCF retaining its majority stake.

Criticism 
The European Passengers’ Federation believes that the merger will give the new company a monopoly position of the market they serve, and lead to higher ticket prices for passengers.

References

Holding companies
High-speed rail in Europe